Kari Haavisto (born 26 April 1941) is a Finnish former freestyle swimmer. He competed in two events at the 1960 Summer Olympics.

References

External links
 

1941 births
Living people
Finnish male freestyle swimmers
Olympic swimmers of Finland
Swimmers at the 1960 Summer Olympics
Swimmers from Helsinki